Alzheimer disease 16 is a protein that in humans is encoded by the AD16 gene.

References 

Genes on human chromosome X